UGodz-Illa Presents: The Hillside Scramblers is the debut album of U-God's group, the Hillside Scramblers.  Among its members are King Just, whose 1995 album Mystics of the God is a favorite early Wu-affiliated album. It was released after he temporarily left the Wu-Tang Clan in 2004.

Reception
Some critics panned the album because they believed that it did not completely satisfy the listeners. Steve Juon complained that the words were mostly clichéd and the beats were similar to U-God's "Golden Arms" tracks.

Track listing
"Intro"
"Pain Inside" (U-God, Black Ice, Leatha Face)
"Lean Like Me" (U-God)
"Destiny" (Leatha Face, INF-Black)
"Stick Up" (INF-Black)
"Tell Me" (Desert Eagle, Leatha Face, INF-Black)
"Chippin' & Chop It" (U-God, INF-Black, Kawz)
"Booty Drop" (Leatha Face, Autumn Rue)
"Spit Game" (U-God, INF-Black, Leatha Face, Autumn Rue)
"Ghetto Gutter" (U-God, Autumn Rue)
"Drama" (Leatha Face, Kawz, INF-Black, U-God)
"Take It To The Top" (U-God, Desert Eagle, INF-Black, King Just, Leatha Face)
"KJ Rhyme" (King Just)
"Gang of Gangstas" (Black Ice, Desert Eagle, INF-Black, Frank Banger, U-God, Leatha Face, Ja-Mal)
"Put It On Me" (U-God, Autumn Rue)
"Struggle Ain't Got No Color" (U-God)
"Here We Come" (INF-Black, Leatha Face, U-God)
"Prayer" (U-God, Autumn Rue)

References

2004 debut albums
U-God albums